Antero Frederico de Seabra (sometimes Anthero; 20 August 1874 – 15 November 1952) was a Portuguese naturalist.
He was founder and president of the Society of Biological Sciences.
He particularly specialized in entomology, publishing a series of foundational papers on the family Aradidae.

Taxa named by him and in his honor
Species named in Seabra's honor include:
Angolan hairy bat (Cistugo seabrae)
Geocharis antheroi

Taxa described by Seabra:
Anchieta's pipistrelle (Pipistrellus anchietae)
D'Anchieta's fruit bat (Plerotes anchietae)
Yellow serotine (Neoromicia flavescens)
Hemiberlesia camarana

References

1874 births
1952 deaths
Portuguese scientists
Portuguese naturalists
People from Lisbon